Richard Cantwell (24 October 1905 – 22 April 1956) was an Australian cricketer. He played one first-class match for Western Australia in 1924/25.

See also
 List of Western Australia first-class cricketers

References

External links
 

1905 births
1956 deaths
Australian cricketers
Western Australia cricketers
People from Warbleton